The Europe/Africa Zone was one of the three zones of the regional Davis Cup competition in 2016.

In the Europe/Africa Zone there were three different tiers, called groups, in which teams competed against each other to advance to the upper tier. Winners in Group I advanced to the World Group Play-offs, along with losing teams from the World Group first round. Teams who lost their respective ties competed in the relegation play-offs, with winning teams remaining in Group I, whereas teams who lost their play-offs were relegated to the Europe/Africa Zone Group II in 2018.

Participating nations

Seeds: 
All seeds and  received a bye into the second round.
 
 
 
  

Remaining nations:

Draw

 and  relegated to Group II in 2018.

First round

Bosnia and Herzegovina vs. Poland

Belarus vs. Romania

Portugal vs. Israel

Second round

Slovakia vs. Hungary

Bosnia and Herzegovina vs. Netherlands

Belarus vs. Austria

Portugal vs. Ukraine

1st round play-offs

Austria vs. Romania

Israel vs. Ukraine

2nd round play-offs

Slovakia vs. Poland

Israel vs. Romania

References

External links
Official Website

Asia/Oceania Zone Group I
Davis Cup Europe/Africa Zone